MediaPro Pictures is the largest film and TV production company in Romania, part of MediaPro Entertainment along with other production units from Czech Republic, Croatia, Slovakia, Slovenia and Bulgaria. Since 2009, MediaPro Entertainment is part of CME (Central European Media Enterprises), a media and entertainment group, who operates broadcasting, internet and TV content companies.

The company received the “Un certain regard” prize in Cannes Film Festival for “california dreamin’(endless)” and in June 2011 with the TIFF award for its short movie "Bora Bora". MediaPro Pictures is the first production company in Romania that produced a film for the American market, “Fire & Ice”, made for the TV station Sci Fi Channel. The latest cinema release is "The Godmother".

Cinema content
Ho Ho Ho 2: O loterie de familie (2012)
Imagine (2014)
Bora Bora (2011) TIFF Award Winner
The Godmother (2011)
Poker (2010)
Ho Ho Ho (2009)
Weeked with my Mother (2009)
Carol, the 1st (2009)
Roming (2007)
Following Her (2007)
California Dreamin' (endless) (2007) Cannes Film Festival Un Certain Regard Winner
Tears of Love (2006)
Three Loony Brothers (2006)
Margo (2006)
Woman of my Dreams (2005)
Second Hand (2005)
Alone vs Myself (2003)
Philanthropy (2002)
Garcea, The Dumbest Man on Earth (2001)

TV content
Comedy Intelligence Agency
Land of Jokes
In the Name of Honour
The Heritage
Aniela
State of Romania
The Countdown2: No Escape
The Countdown
Mothers and Doctors
Little Angels
Regina
A Simple Movie
Fire & Ice
Gypsy Heart
The Antechamber
House Arrest
The War of the Sexes
Here Comes the Police!
Daria, My Love
One Step Ahead
A Movie-like Romance
At the Office
Taca-Paca
Poor Man, Rich Man
The Immigrants
Neighbors Forever
Coupling
The Sins of Eve
Only Love
Good Guys

See also
MediaPro Studios

References

External links
Official website
MediaPro Pictures at IMDb.com

Central European Media Enterprises
Film production companies of Romania